Rowland Louis Johnston (April 23, 1872 – September 22, 1939) was a U.S. Representative from Missouri's 16th congressional district.

Born in Louisiana, Missouri, Johnston attended the public schools.
He studied law.
He was admitted to the bar in 1894 and commenced practice in St. Louis, Missouri.
He served as a member of the State house of representatives in 1892–1896.
He served as prosecuting attorney of St. Louis County in 1904–1908.
He served as delegate to the 1908 Republican National Convention.
He served as assistant circuit attorney for the city of St. Louis in 1920–1926.
He served as a member of the State militia.
During the Spanish–American War, he served as a recruiting officer.
He moved to Rolla, Missouri, in 1926 and continued the practice of law.

Johnston was elected as a Republican to the Seventy-first Congress (March 4, 1929 – March 3, 1931).
He was an unsuccessful candidate for reelection in 1930 to the Seventy-second Congress and for election in 1932 to the Seventy-third Congress.
He resumed the practice of law in Rolla, Missouri, until his death there on September 22, 1939.
He remains were cremated and the ashes deposited in the mausoleum at Oak Grove Cemetery, St. Louis, Missouri.

References

External links

1872 births
1939 deaths
United States Army officers
Republican Party members of the United States House of Representatives from Missouri
People from Louisiana, Missouri